Touit is a genus of Neotropical parrots in the family Psittacidae.

The genus was introduced by the English zoologist George Robert Gray in 1855 with the scarlet-shouldered parrotlet (Touit huetii) as the type species. The genus name is derived from the extinct Tupi language that was spoken by native people in Brazil: Tuí eté means "really little parrot". In 1648 the German naturalist Georg Marcgrave used Tuiete for a small parrot in his Historia Naturalis Brasiliae.

The genus contains the following eight species:

References

External links

 
Psittacidae
Bird genera
Taxa named by George Robert Gray
Taxonomy articles created by Polbot